Warren Antoine Cartier  (January 12, 1866 – November 7, 1934) was a 19th-century businessman. He was twice elected mayor of the Ludington, Michigan and was a banker, and a lumber tycoon. In civic life, he was involved with many societies and organizations.

Early life 
Warren Antoine Cartier's father was Antoine E. Cartier. He was born on January 12, 1866, in Manistee, Michigan. His family moved to Ludington, Michigan when he was twelve years old.

Cartier attended church schools and public schools, and a Varennes business college near Montreal for two years. He then enrolled at Indiana's University of Notre Dame in 1884 at the age of 18 and graduated in 1887 with a civil engineering degree.

Personal life 

Cartier married Catherine Dempsey on May 22, 1888. They had three sons.

The Cartier's residence was the  Warren A. and Catherine Cartier House at Ludington, Michigan. They also had a home at Poincians Park in Fort Myers, Florida.

Cartier and his wife were Catholic and attended St. Simon Church of Ludington.

Cartier supported the Republican party, serving as secretary of the Mason County Republican committee for two years. He was the Ludington city mayor in 1899 and 1903. He served two years as the city recorder.

Career 
After college, Cartier returned to Ludington and joined his father's Cartier Lumber Company. 
 
Cartier also held the following positions:

 Cartier-Magmer Company  secretary and treasurer
 Star Watch Case Company  secretary
 State Bank of Ludington  president
 Bank of Fountain, Mason County  vicepresident
 Mason County Real Estate Company  vicepresident
 Rath & Cartier  partner in a lumber company
 Ludington State Bank – founder
 Ludington Gas Company – founder
 United Home Telephone Company  founder
 Electric Tamper & Equipment Company  president

Associations 

Cartier was connected with or a member of the Knights of Columbus, Benevolent and Protective Order of Elks (BPOE), Knights of the Maccabees, Royal Arcanum, and the Catholic Mutual Benefit Association (he was president of the state association of Michigan for nine years; also a member of the board of trustees). He was also recording secretary of the National Catholic Extension Society and past grand knight of the Pere Marquette council of the Knights of Columbus. He was knighted  to the Order of St. Gregory the Great.

Death 
Cartier died suddenly of a heart attack at age 68 in Chicago on November 7, 1934 while receiving medical attention for a kidney problem.

Footnotes

References

 

1866 births
1934 deaths
19th-century American politicians
20th-century American politicians
Businesspeople from Michigan
Mayors of places in Michigan
Notre Dame Fighting Irish football players
People from Ludington, Michigan
People from Manistee, Michigan
People of the Michigan Territory
Michigan Republicans
Deaths from kidney disease